Caripeta angustiorata, known generally as the brown pine looper or oblique girdle, is a species of geometrid moth in the family Geometridae. It is found in North America.

The MONA or Hodges number for Caripeta angustiorata is 6867.

References

Further reading

External links

 

Ourapterygini
Articles created by Qbugbot
Moths described in 1863